Los que ayudan a Dios (English: Those who help God) is a Mexican telenovela produced by Valentín Pimstein for Televisa in 1973.

Plot 
Julia, Martha, Elena and Alicia are four young women who become friends working at the hospital where they are voluntary. Each drags his own fears and personal conflicts between the tragic and depressing environment surrounding the hospital.

Cast 
Maricruz Olivier as Julia
Kitty de Hoyos as Martha
Alicia Rodríguez as Elena
Norma Herrera as Alicia
Carlos Alberto Badiaz as Diego
Claudio Obregón as Gustavo
Enrique Becker as Mauricio
Fernando Luján as Fernando
Julieta Bracho as Mayra
René Muñoz as Dr. César Grajales
Javier Ruan as Daniel
Rafael del Río as Luis
Lupe Lara as Millie
Raúl Meraz as Horacio
Ana Lilia Tovar as Mabel
Elsa Cárdenas as Adriana
Alicia Bonet as María Isabel
Fernando Mendoza as Sr. Velazco
Dolores Camarillo as Magda
Leopoldo Falcón as Sr. Castro
Zully Keith as Lola

References

External links 

Mexican telenovelas
1973 telenovelas
Televisa telenovelas
Spanish-language telenovelas
1973 Mexican television series debuts
1973 Mexican television series endings